Xanthacrona phyllochaeta is a species of ulidiid or picture-winged fly in the genus Xanthacrona of the family Ulidiidae.

References

Ulidiidae